The Dance Class is an 1874 painting by Edgar Degas. It is in the collection of the Metropolitan Museum of Art.

The painting and its companion work in the Musée d'Orsay, Paris are amongst the most ambitious works by Degas on the theme of ballet. The imaginary scene depicts a dance class being held under the supervision of Jules Perrot, a famous ballet master, in the old Paris Opera, which had actually burnt down the previous year.
The poster on the wall for Rossini’s Guillaume Tell is a tribute to the operatic singer Jean-Baptiste Faure, who had commissioned the work.

The painting is on view in the Metropolitan Museum's Gallery 815.

See also
 The Ballet Class (Degas, Musée d'Orsay)

References

External links
Impressionism : a centenary exhibition, the Metropolitan Museum of Art, December 12, 1974-February 10, 1975, fully digitized text from The Metropolitan Museum of Art libraries 

Paintings by Edgar Degas
1874 paintings
Paintings in the collection of the Metropolitan Museum of Art
Dance in art
Mirrors in art